Jon Ander Garrido Moracia (born 9 October 1989) is a Spanish professional footballer who plays as a defensive midfielder for Cádiz CF.

Club career
Born in Bilbao, Biscay, Garrido made his senior debut for CD Getxo in 2008, in the regional levels. In the 2010 summer he moved straight to Segunda División B, signing for Barakaldo CF.

On 21 January 2014, Garrido joined La Liga side Granada CF, but was immediately loaned to Cádiz CF also in the third level. On 6 July, his loan was extended for a further year.

On 29 July 2015, Garrido signed a permanent two-year deal with the Yellow Submarine. The following 22 January, after featuring sparingly, he was loaned to fellow third division club Racing de Ferrol, until June. 

Garrido returned to Cádiz after his loan expired, and made his professional debut on 19 August 2016 by starting in a 1–1 away draw against UD Almería. On 28 July 2018, after becoming an undisputed starter under Álvaro Cervera, he renewed his contract until 2020. On 30 October 2019, he prolonged his contract with the Andalusian club until 30 June 2023. 

Garrido achieved promotion to the top tier in 2020, and made his debut in the category on 1 October of that year, starting in a 1–0 away win over Athletic Bilbao. In August 2021, he suffered a knee injury, being sidelined for the remainder of the year.

On 27 January 2022, Garrido was loaned to CD Mirandés in the second division for the remainder of the season.

Career statistics

Club

References

External links

1989 births
Living people
Spanish footballers
Footballers from Bilbao
Association football midfielders
La Liga players
Segunda División players
Segunda División B players
Tercera División players
CD Getxo players
Barakaldo CF footballers
Granada CF footballers
Cádiz CF players
Racing de Ferrol footballers
CD Mirandés footballers